The Margaret is a historic apartment building located in North Omaha, Nebraska. Built in 1916, it was added to the National Register of Historic Places in 2007.

Financed, built and owned by Omaha master builder Robert C. Strehlow, it was designed by F.A. Henninger. The Margaret was built at the same time as the Strehlow Terrace's building called the Roland. The Margaret was built for Strehlow's youngest child.

References

National Register of Historic Places in Omaha, Nebraska
Apartment buildings in Omaha, Nebraska
Residential buildings on the National Register of Historic Places in Nebraska